The Catholic Times may refer to:

The Catholic Times (UK and Ireland), a weekly newspaper in the United Kingdom and Ireland
The Catholic Times (Wisconsin), a publication by the Roman Catholic Diocese of La Crosse in La Crosse, Wisconsin
The Catholic Times, a former publication by the Roman Catholic Diocese of Columbus in Columbus, Ohio
Catholic Times, a publication by the Roman Catholic Diocese of Springfield in Springfield, Illinois